Antoinette Butte,  (July 12, 1898 in Lunéville, Meurthe-et-Moselle - 30 April 1986 in Tarascon, Bouches-du-Rhône) was the French Protestant founder of French Girl Guiding from 1916, then Head of the Pomeyrol Community from 1938.

References 

1898 births
1986 deaths
Scouting and Guiding in France
Scouting pioneers
People from Lunéville